is a railway station in the town of Higashiizu, Shizuoka Prefecture, Japan, operated by the privately owned Izu Kyūkō Line .

Lines

Station layout
Izu-Hokkawa Station  has a single elevated side platform. The station building is located underneath. The station is not attended.

Adjacent stations

History 
Izu-Hokkawa Station was opened on December 10, 1961.

Station layout
Izu-Hokkawa Station

Passenger statistics
In fiscal 2017, the station was used by an average of 31 passengers daily (boarding passengers only).

Surrounding area
Hokkawa Onsen

See also
 List of Railway Stations in Japan

References

External links

Official home page.

Railway stations in Shizuoka Prefecture
Izu Kyūkō Line
Railway stations in Japan opened in 1961
Stations of Izu Kyūkō
Higashiizu, Shizuoka